Mian Volan-e Vosta (also Romanized as Mīān Volān-e Vosţá) is a village in Doab Rural District, in the Central District of Selseleh County, Lorestan Province, Iran. At the 2006 census, its population was 44, in 9 families.

References 

Towns and villages in Selseleh County